Eichsfeld-Südharz was a Verwaltungsgemeinschaft ("collective municipality") in the district Eichsfeld, in Thuringia, Germany. The seat of the Verwaltungsgemeinschaft was in Weißenborn-Lüderode. The Verwaltungsgemeinschaft was disbanded on 1 December 2011, when its constituent municipalities (except Am Ohmberg) merged into the new municipality Sonnenstein.

The Verwaltungsgemeinschaft Eichsfeld-Südharz consisted of the following municipalities:

 Am Ohmberg 
 Bockelnhagen 
 Holungen 
 Jützenbach 
 Silkerode 
 Steinrode 
 Stöckey 
 Weißenborn-Lüderode 
 Zwinge

References

Former Verwaltungsgemeinschaften in Thuringia